Dhaka Cantonment railway station is a railway station located in Dhaka, Bangladesh. It is notable as one of the termini of the Bangladesh-India Maitree Express international passenger train service.

The station is located in its namesake Dhaka Cantonment, Cantonment Thana, in the north of Dhaka. The station is near the Shahjalal International Airport (however the airport has its own station).

Services
Maitree Express
Mitali Express

References

External link 
 

Buildings and structures in Dhaka
Railway stations in Dhaka District
Transport in Dhaka